Portage Historic District is a national historic district located at Portage in Cambria County, Pennsylvania. The district includes 561 contributing buildings and 5 contributing structures (4 are bridges) in the central business district and surrounding residential areas of Portage. Most of the buildings were built between 1900 and 1925, with the oldest dated to the 1870s.  Notable non-residential buildings include the Pennsylvania Railroad freight station (c. 1906), Pennsylvania Railroad passenger station (c. 1916), Palmer Feed Mill (c. 1916), Pearce Building (1914), Central Hotel (c. 1916), Century Ribbon Mill (1906-1911), Portage Bronze Electric Company (c. 1916), First Lutheran Church (1872), S. Michael's Orthodox Church (1915), and Hungarian Hall (c. 1920).

It was listed on the National Register of Historic Places in 1995.

References 

Historic districts in Cambria County, Pennsylvania
Historic districts on the National Register of Historic Places in Pennsylvania
National Register of Historic Places in Cambria County, Pennsylvania